"Breakup 2 Makeup (Remix)" is a song by American singer Ashanti, released as the first single from her first remix album Collectables by Ashanti. It features her labelmate Black Child. It reached number 76 on the US Billboard Hot R&B/Hip-Hop Singles & Tracks chart, becoming Ashanti's first single to not reach the US Billboard Hot 100. The song was originally recorded as a solo version on Ashanti's second album Chapter II but was later remixed for the single release while Ashanti was working on her next album.

The video was produced by Irv Gotti and begins in black and white before progressing to color. It shows Ashanti and Black Child singing to each other and includes a dance off towards the beginning of the video, as well as Ashanti and her female backup dancers performing a choreographed dance-break near the end. It was released in early 2004 to BET's 106 & Park.

Track listing
"Breakup 2 Makeup (Remix)" (radio edit)   
"Breakup 2 Makeup (Remix)" (instrumental version)   
"Breakup 2 Makeup (Remix)" (call out research hook)

Charts

References

2004 singles
Songs written by Ashanti (singer)
Songs written by Irv Gotti
Ashanti (singer) songs
2003 songs
Songs written by Chink Santana